Southport station is a commuter rail station on the Metro-North Railroad New Haven Line, located in Southport, Connecticut. It is one of three railroad stations in the town of Fairfield, the others being Fairfield and Fairfield Metro.

History 

The station was opened in 1884, and the existing westbound and eastbound station buildings were constructed in the late 19th century by the New York, New Haven, and Hartford Railroad. The westbound building is wooden, built in the saltbox-style. The eastbound building is made of brick, and is no longer in railroad use. Instead, it houses a restaurant. The station agent was eliminated on January 15, 1972. In 1989, the station buildings were listed in the National Register of Historic Places as the Southport Railroad Stations.

The westbound station house, one of the few remaining original station houses on the New Haven Line, was gutted by a fire on January 4, 2008. The building housed both an art gallery and a passenger waiting area prior to fire. The majority of the artwork was saved. Most of the damage done to the building during the fire was caused by the water that was being used to extinguish the fire. It was predicted that the building would have to be entirely replaced, but it was decided instead to refurbish it after the damage was assessed to be less severe than originally thought. The refurbishment cost $3 million. A temporary waiting room was created for passengers at the station. The refurbishment was finished by the beginning of the next year, and was officially re-opened by then-governor Jodi Rell in February 2009.

Station layout
The station has two offset high-level side platforms, each four cars long, serving the outer tracks of the four-track Northeast Corridor. It has 179 parking spaces, of which 99 are owned by the state.

See also
 National Register of Historic Places listings in Fairfield County, Connecticut

References

External links

Bureau of Public Transportation of the Connecticut Department of Transportation, "Condition Inspection for the Southport Station" report dated September 2002
 Center Street entrance from Google Maps Street View

Metro-North Railroad stations in Connecticut
Railroad stations in Fairfield County, Connecticut
Buildings and structures in Fairfield, Connecticut
Stations on the Northeast Corridor
Stations along New York, New Haven and Hartford Railroad lines
Railway stations on the National Register of Historic Places in Connecticut
Queen Anne architecture in Connecticut
Railway stations in the United States opened in 1848
National Register of Historic Places in Fairfield County, Connecticut
1848 establishments in Connecticut